Kevin Arbet (born March 26, 1981) is a former American football cornerback for the Arena Football League's San Jose SaberCats. His uncle, Darren Arbet was the head coach of the SaberCats.

College career
Arbet played college football at the University of Southern California.

High school career
Arbet prepped at St. Mary's High School in Stockton, California.

Personal
His stepfather is Jeff Simmons, a 1983 draft choice of the then Los Angeles Rams. As well, his younger brother Ewing Simmons played college football with the University of New Mexico as a weak side defensive lineman.

External links
 Arena Football League page

1981 births
Living people
Players of American football from Stockton, California
American football cornerbacks
USC Trojans football players
San Jose SaberCats players